Highcliffe and Walkford is a ward in Christchurch, Dorset. Since 2019, the ward has elected 2 councillors to Bournemouth, Christchurch and Poole Council.

History 
The ward has a parish council of the same name. On 8 July 2022, councillor and former mayor of Christchurch Nick Geary died.

Geography 
The ward is in the far east of the council area, and covers the areas of Highcliffe and Walkford.

Councillors 
The ward is currently represented by two independent councillors.

Election results

2022 by-election 
The by-election triggered by the death of councillor Nick Geary was held on 6 October 2022. Voter turnout was 33.22%.

2019

References 

Politics of Christchurch, Dorset
Wards of Bournemouth, Christchurch and Poole